The 2021–22 Clemson Tigers men's basketball team represented Clemson University during the 2021–22 NCAA Division I men's basketball season. The Tigers were led by twelfth-year head coach Brad Brownell and played their home games at Littlejohn Coliseum in Clemson, South Carolina as members of the Atlantic Coast Conference.

The Tigers finished the season 17–16 overall and 8–12 in ACC play to finish in tenth place.  As the tenth seed in the ACC tournament, they defeated fifteenth seed NC State in the first round before losing to seventh seed, and eventual champions Virginia Tech in the second round.  They were not invited to the NCAA tournament or the NIT.

Previous season
The Tigers finished the 2020–21 season 16–8, 10–6 in ACC play to finish in a tie for fifth place. As the fifth seed in the ACC tournament they earned a bye into the Second Round where they lost to Miami.  They earned an at-large bid to the NCAA tournament as a seven seed in the Midwest Region.  They lost in the first round to 10 seed Rutgers.

Offseason

Coaching changes 
Assistant coach Anthony Goins was hired by Boston College to be an assistant coach.  The Tigers named Kareem Richardson as his replacement on April 22.

Departures

Incoming transfers

2021 recruiting class

Roster

Schedule and results

|-
!colspan=9 style=| Exbitition

|-
!colspan=9 style=| Regular season

|-
!colspan=9 style=|ACC tournament

Source

Rankings

See also
2021–22 Clemson Tigers women's basketball team

References

Clemson Tigers men's basketball seasons
Clemson
Clemson
Clemson